The 2017 Professional Women's Bowling Association (PWBA) Tour retained a similar schedule to the 2016 season, with nine standard tournaments and four majors. The season ran April 27 to September 6. CBS Sports Network aired the final round of all standard PWBA Tour events this season on a tape-delay basis. The final round for the major tournaments aired live or on same-day delay. TV tapings of the non-major stepladder finals were conducted in conjunction with first three major tournaments on May 23 (USBC Queens), June 25 (PWBA Players Championship) and August 6 (U.S. Women's Open).

The season's final event and final major, the Smithfield PWBA Tour Championship, was an invitational featuring a starting field of only 16 bowlers. Tournament winners from the current season gained automatic entry into the starting field, with the remaining spots given to bowlers with the highest 2017 point totals among non-winners.

The PBA/PWBA Striking Against Breast Cancer Mixed Doubles, a cross-over event with the PBA Tour, returned for 2017. PBA and PWBA titles were awarded to the male and female winners, respectively, which means 14 total PWBA titles were up for grabs in 2017.

Season awards and statistics

Player awards
 PWBA Player of the Year: Liz Johnson
 PWBA Rookie of the Year: Daria Pajak

2017 points leaders
1. Liz Johnson (154,150)
2. Kelly Kulick (104,000)
3. Shannon O'Keefe (100,190)

2017 match play appearances
1. Liz Johnson (11)
2. Shannon O'Keefe (10)
T3. Kelly Kulick (9)
T3. Maria Jose Rodriguez (9)

2017 final round appearances
1. Liz Johnson (9)
T2. Kelly Kulick (4)
T2. Danielle McEwan (4)

Tournament summary

Below is a recap of events scheduled for the 2017 PWBA Tour season. Major tournaments are in bold. Career PWBA title numbers for winners are shown in parenthesis (#).

C: broadcast on CBS Sports Network
X: broadcast on the PBA's Xtra Frame webcast service

References

External links
 PWBA.com, home of the Professional Women' Bowling Association

2017 in bowling